Living Field is an album released by the Pillows on March 24, 1995.

Track listing
 "Angel Fish" (エンゼルフィッシュ) – 4:07
 "Sunday" – 3:15
 "Daydream Wonder" – 3:28
 "Swinger's Night Club" –1:54
 "Something Like a Romance" – 4:44
 "Girlfriend" (ガールフレンド) – 4:33
 "The Killing Field" – 4:09
 "Happy Slave" – 4:29
 "Native World" – 4:51
 "Climbing the Roof" (屋上に昇って) – 3:22
 "Bye Bye Sweet Pain" – 3:45

The Pillows albums
1995 albums